Troadio Delgado (born 28 December 1949) is a Cuban rower. He competed in the men's coxless four event at the 1972 Summer Olympics.

References

1949 births
Living people
Cuban male rowers
Olympic rowers of Cuba
Rowers at the 1972 Summer Olympics
Place of birth missing (living people)
Pan American Games medalists in rowing
Pan American Games silver medalists for Cuba
Rowers at the 1971 Pan American Games